EarthCARE (derived from Earth Clouds, Aerosols and Radiation Explorer) is a planned joint European/Japanese (ESA / JAXA / NICT) satellite, the sixth of ESA's Earth Explorer Programme. The main goal of the mission is the observation and characterization of clouds and aerosols as well as measuring the reflected solar radiation and the infrared radiation emitted from Earth's surface and atmosphere.

History
In May 2008, ESA signed a contract worth €263 million (£220 million/US$360 million) with EADS subsidiary Astrium. As the prime contractor, Astrium is responsible for the satellite's design, development and integration. Design and construction began in early 2009.

EarthCARE is an acronym standing for Earth Clouds, Aerosols and Radiation Explorer, and the aims of the mission are to improve understanding of the cloud, radiative and aerosol processes that affect the Earth's climate. As of January 2011, the total budget for the project is £500 million (€590 million/US$810 million). A significant proportion of the project will be manufactured in the UK, the main structure of the spacecraft will be built by RUAG Space in Switzerland and subsequently completed in Astrium's Stevenage facility, while one of the instruments will be made in Sevenoaks by SSTL and another in Bristol, Somerset by SEA Group Ltd, now part of Thales Alenia Space UK. In September 2014, ESA and JAXA held a joined EarthCARE International Science Workshop. From 2014 to 2015, an ongoing integration of the instruments took place. In 2015, the launch was postponed to 2018 due to problems with lidar development. As of October 2022, EarthCARE's launch is scheduled for early 2024.

Mission
The mission is to provide a picture of the 3-dimensional spatial and the temporal structure of the radiative flux field at the top of the atmosphere, within the atmosphere and at the Earth's surface. The high-performance lidar and radar technology, plus the synergistic use of the different remote sensing techniques embarked on board EarthCARE, will deliver unprecedented datasets allowing scientists to study the relationship of clouds, aerosols, and radiation at accuracy levels that will significantly improve our understanding of these highly-variable parameters. The mission will provide this information to improve predictions about the weather and future climate.

Science
The satellite will make measurements useful for a better understanding of the Earth's thermal and solar radiation balance. In particular, a combination of active (lidar and radar) and passive (radiometers and imagers) instruments will enable EarthCARE to simultaneously measure the vertical and horizontal distribution of clouds and atmospheric aerosols along with Top-Of-Atmosphere (TOA) Long- and Short-wave fluxes.

The spacecraft will feature four distinct instruments:
 ATmospheric LIDar (ATLID) - ESA - 354.8 nm, high-spectral resolution and depolarisation (aerosols).
 Cloud Profiling Radar (CPR) - JAXA / NICT - 36 dBZ sensitivity, 500 m horizontal and 100 m vertical sampling resolution, Doppler capability (clouds). Operating at 94.05GHz.
 Multi-Spectral Imager (MSI) - ESA - 7 channels, 150 km swath, 500 m pixel resolution (clouds and aerosols).
 Broad-Band Radiometer (BBR) - ESA - 2 channels, 3 views (nadir, fore and aft) (radiations).

See also
 ESA's Living Planet Programme
 GOCE
 SMOS
 CryoSat & CryoSat-2
 Swarm
 ADM-Aeolus
 BIOMASS
 FLEX

References

External links
 EarthCARE page on ESA website
 EarthCARE on ESA eoPortal
 EarthCARE page on JAXA website
 EarthCARE on JAXA Earth Observation Research Center

Earth observation satellites of the European Space Agency
Satellites of Japan
Proposed satellites
2024 in spaceflight
2024 in Japan